Matilda International Hospital is a For-profit Community Hospital in Hong Kong located at 41 Mount Kellett Road, The Peak, Hong Kong Island. The hospital was built as a result of the last will and testament of Granville Sharp, the husband of Matilda Lincolne Sharp. Granville Sharp was a   successful banker descended from the well-known Sharp family of Romsey, Hampshire, United Kingdom, another member of which was 'Conversation' Sharp.

History
Originally from the UK, Granville Sharp and his wife Matilda moved to  Hong Kong. Matilda died in 1893, and Granville bequeathed a hospital to be constructed in his wife's memory upon his own death.

The hospital admitted its first patients in 1907, at that time providing free care to expatriates. Non-British were barred from The Peak by legislation, and could not benefit from being treated in the hospital. The original building,  still in use today, is outstandingly beautiful, as is the hospital's location in The Peak, Hong Kong Island.

In the past it was known as the Matilda Memorial & War Hospital, but  it has been renamed Matilda International Hospital (MIH), and is a not-for-profit hospital serving all the people of Hong Kong and the wider region.  It provides core services, including maternity, orthopaedics and spine, surgical, health assessment and outpatient services. 

The Matilda Medical Centre (MMC) was opened in the Central area of Hong Kong to mark the hospital's centenary celebration in 2007, and extended its  services to Caine Road, Mid-Levels serving a wider public and corporate clients. 

Joining hands with Asia Medical Specialists, The Matilda Orthopaedic and Spine Centre opened in the year of 2017, with the outpatient clinic at the peak and central.

The  Hospital used to be surveyed and accredited bi-annually by the Trent Accreditation Scheme of the United Kingdom.  In 2010 it adopted the standards of the Australian Council on Healthcare Standards (ACHS), becoming fully ACHS accredited in December 2010.  The hospital has also obtained the ISO 9001:2008 certification, a non-clinically orientated quality management system.

See also 
 List of hospitals in Hong Kong
 Health in Hong Kong
 Royal Naval Hospital (Hong Kong)
 First houses on the Peak

References

External links

Hospital buildings completed in 1907
Hospitals in Hong Kong
Hospitals established in 1907
Victoria Peak
Grade III historic buildings in Hong Kong
1907 establishments in Hong Kong
Grade II historic buildings in Hong Kong